Nakkhul Jaidev is an Indian actor and playback singer who works in Tamil cinema. He debuted as one of the lead actors in the 2003 film Boys directed by S. Shankar. He sang his first song in the soundtrack album for Anniyan (2005).

Career

2003–2009: Beginning
Nakul was just 19 years old when he was chosen for the part of Juju in Shankar's coming-of-age film Boys (2003). His family had initially sent some pictures of his elder brother Mayur to Shankar's office, but after seeing Nakkhul in one of the pictures, Shankar approached him to portray a leading role alongside an ensemble cast of newcomers. The film opened in August 2003 to mixed reviews but the high-profile nature of the technical team ensured that the film was publicized and took a good opening at the box office. He then subsequently did a Telugu language film titled Keelu Gurram, in which he played a supporting role, which didn’t do well at the box office.  He struggled to get a breakthrough as an actor and during the period, he worked as a playback singer in films, notably recording for Harris Jayaraj in his albums for Anniyan, Ghajini and Vettaiyaadu Vilaiyaadu.

He signed on to feature in Prasad's Kadhalil Vizhunthen, his first film as a lead actor, in 2007 and lost close to 20 kilograms in order to fit into the role of his character. Nakkhul revealed that the director and himself were wary that the film would define their careers in the film industry, and shot on a trial-and-error basis and were not in a hurry to complete the film, with production taking almost two years. The film gained unexpected publicity after "Nakka Mukka", a song composed by Vijay Antony for the soundtrack, became a big success and the venture was consequently selected by media giants Sun Pictures to become their first project for film distribution. Portraying a semi-psychotic character who refuses to accept the death of his lover, the film saw Nakul paired alongside actress Sunaina. The film released in 2008 and became a commercial hit, with critics raving and praising his performance stating "Nakul  is riveting" and that "he holds the film together and dances with élan, and has a good future." Sun Pictures also chose to distribute his next venture, the romantic comedy Maasilamani (2009) opposite Sunaina again, with the film becoming a surprise huge box office success. He next featured in AGS Entertainment's Kandhakottai with Poorna, which opened to average response critically and commercially.

2013–2018: Mixed reviews
Nakul subsequently went four years without a film release, though he continued to work on several ventures simultaneously. In an interview, he stated that he preferred quality over quantity of work. Prithvi Rajkumar's thriller drama film Naan Rajavaga Pogiren released in 2013 to mixed reviews." His next release, Vallinam (2014), had been in production since mid 2011 and featured Nakul  as a basketball player. To prepare for the role, Nakul underwent special training to "ensure that he lived the role rather than act". The film opened to positive reviews, with a critic noting "Nakul gives his career's best performance. He proves that a hero can step out of the commercial zone and take up roles that can still be liked by audience." He went on next be seen in Naga Venkatesh's Narathan, while K. S. Adhiyaman's long-delayed venture Amali Thumali, in which Nakul co-stars with Shanthnu Bhagyaraj, was also expected to be completed in 2014. In 2015, his Tamizhuku En Ondrai Azhuthavum  released which turned out to be  good reviews. He then went on to act in Brahma.com (2017). Though the movie received very mixed reviews. Sei (2018), in which he plays a role of an aspiring actor Saravedi Saravanan which did average in the box office.

Personal life
Nakkhul was born in Mumbai, Maharashtra to Jaidev and Lakshmi. His father is from Karnataka and his mother is from Kerala.His elder sister is actress Devayani. His elder brother, Mayur, has also attempted to make a career as an actor, though several of his films have been stalled prior to completion. He is married to his long-time girlfriend Sruti Bhaskar since 28 February 2016. His wife and him are known for singing together and making videos on their Instagram handles which receive a response among his fans. They are also known for being animal lovers and own many cats and dogs. They have been advocates for Indian dogs and post many cute pictures and videos. They have daughter Akira, who was born in August 2020 and a son Amore who was born in June 2022

Filmography

As an actor

As a playback singer

As a dubbing artiste 
Mazhai Pidikkatha Manithan (TBA) for Pruthvi Ambaar

Television

References

External links

Tamil male actors
Living people
Indian male film actors
Telugu playback singers
Tamil playback singers
Indian male playback singers
Male actors from Mumbai
Konkani people
1984 births